The following list contains notable inventions and discoveries made by ethnic Armenians, including those not born or living in modern-day Armenia and those of partial Armenian ancestry.

List
Default sorted chronologically

See also
List of Armenians
List of Armenian scientists

References

Inventors
Armenian